Ana Juneja (born 11 December 1990) also known as Ana Skoumal, is an Indian-American Intellectual property and trademark Lawyer.

Personal life 
Ana Juneja was born in Bhopal, India on December 11, 1990. In 1993, her family moved to America. 

She had her high school education from a local school in Michigan. Juneja attended Michigan State University.

Career 
In 2018, Juneja moved to Illinois, Chicago, and passed the Illinois Bar Exam and was sworn into the Illinois Supreme Court as an attorney on May 10. 2018. 

She began her career as an intellectual property (IP) attorney at Dennemeyer & Associates. 

In 2021, Juneja left her position at Dennemeyer and started her own intellectual property law firm, Ana Law LLC. Since launching her law firm, Juneja has helped many entrepreneurs, celebrities, and influencers protect their brands and intellectual property.

References 

Living people
1990 births